Mak Hing Tak (born 28 October 1959) is a Hong Kong racing driver currently competing in the TCR International Series. Having previously competed in the Audi R8 LMS Cup and Porsche Carrera Cup Asia amongst others.

Racing career
Mak began his career in 2009 in Porsche Carrera Cup Asia, he raced there up until 2014. In 2012 he also raced in the Audi R8 LMS Cup. He came 2nd in class in the 2011 6 Hours of Zhuhai, driving an Audi R8 LMS.

In September 2015 it was announced that he would race in the TCR Asia Series & TCR International Series, driving an Opel Astra OPC for Campos Racing. However Mak crashed on the warming up lap for race 1 and therefore didn't start any of the two races.

Racing record

Complete TCR International Series results
(key) (Races in bold indicate pole position) (Races in italics indicate fastest lap)

References

External links
 

1959 births
Living people
TCR Asia Series drivers
TCR International Series drivers
Hong Kong racing drivers
Campos Racing drivers